The 1990–91 South Pacific cyclone season was one of the least active tropical cyclone seasons on record, with only two tropical cyclones occurring within the South Pacific basin to the east of 160°E. The season officially ran from November 1, 1990 to April 30, 1991, with the first disturbance of the season forming on November 23, 1990, while the final disturbance dissipated on May 19, 1991. During the season there were no deaths recorded from any of the tropical cyclones while they were within the basin. However, six people were killed by Cyclone Joy, when it made landfall on Australia. As a result of the impacts caused by Joy and Sina, the names were retired from the tropical cyclone naming lists.

During the season, tropical cyclones were monitored by the Fiji Meteorological Service and the New Zealand MetService, while other meteorological services such as the Australian Bureau of Meteorology, Meteo France as well as the United States Joint Typhoon Warning Center and Naval Western Oceanography Center (NWOC) also monitored the basin. The JTWC issued warnings between 160°E and the International Date Line, while the NWOC issued warnings for tropical cyclones forming between the International Date Line and the coasts of the Americas. Both the JTWC and the NWOC designated tropical cyclones with a number and either a P suffix with numbers assigned in order to tropical cyclones developing within the whole of the Southern Hemisphere. The FMS, MetService and the BoM all used the Australian Tropical Cyclone Intensity Scale and estimate wind speeds over a ten-minute period, while the JTWC estimated sustained winds over a one-minute period, which are subsequently compared to the Saffir–Simpson hurricane wind scale (SSHWS).



Seasonal summary 

As a result of the South Pacific Convergence Zone being both weaker and located further to the north than in previous seasons and the Madden–Julian oscillations being weaker and less regular defined than in previous tropical cyclone seasons. As a result, only three tropical cyclones occurred within the South Pacific basin between 160°E and 120°W, which made the season one of the least active on record. The first tropical cyclone was first noted as a shallow depression on November 20 before it was named Sina on November 24 after it had intensified into a tropical cyclone. After peaking as a category three severe tropical cyclone on the Australian tropical cyclone intensity scale, Sina affected Fiji, Tonga, Niue and the Southern Cook Islands with total damage estimated at over  before it was last noted on December 4, as it was absorbed by an advancing trough of low pressure near 50°S. During December 15, the precursor tropical low to Cyclone Joy developed near the Solomon Islands. Over the next two days, the system moved westwards before it moved into the Australian region during December 17. The system was subsequently named Joy on December 19, before it made landfall on Queensland during December 26.

Over the next couple of days the system moved towards the south-east before the JTWC designated the system 16P and initiated advisories on it during March 18, after it had moved into the South Pacific basin. Over the next couple of days the system, moved towards the south-southeast, before it turned towards the southwest and passed over New Caledonia on March 20, before it was last noted during the next day moving out of the basin. The final tropical cyclone of the season, Lisa, moved into the Southern Pacific on May 11 at its peak intensity of 110 km/h (75 mph). During the next day as the storm moved towards the subtropical jet, Lisa rapidly weakened into a tropical depression before passing over Anatom Island without causing any significant damage. After the season both the names Sina and Joy were retired from the naming lists for the region, while it was determined that a weak gale force tropical cyclone had affected Tonga between December 14–17.

Systems

Severe Tropical Cyclone Sina 

On November 20, the FMS started to monitor a shallow tropical depression that had developed within the South Pacific Convergence Zone to the west of Wallis Island. Over the next three days the system moved towards the west-northwest and the Fijian dependency of Rotuma, before the JTWC initiated advisories and classified the depression as Tropical Cyclone 03P during November 24. During the next day the cyclone continued to intensify and developed an eye as it moved erratically towards the west-southwest and performed a small clockwise loop. During that day Sina's eye became very distinct on satellite imagery, as it intensified and the upper level steering flow which resulted in Sina moving erratically towards the southeast and Fiji.

Early on November 29, Sina weakened into a category two tropical cyclone on the Australian scale just before it passed to the north of Tongatapu in Tonga. During that day the system moved eastwards towards the Southern Cook Islands and gradually weakened further. The system subsequently rapidly weakened and transitioned into an extratropical cyclone under the influence of strong vertical wind shear and cooler sea surface temperatures. Over the next couple of days Sina's extratropical remnants maintained a southeastward track, before it was absorbed by an advancing trough of low pressure near 50°S on December 4.

Ahead of the system affecting Fiji, hundreds of holiday makers were evacuated from Fiji's outer island resorts to hotels on the mainland. High winds and heavy rain forced the closure of several local airports and the main Nadi International Airport. As Sina moved through the archipelago, the system destroyed or damaged houses and other building structures, while bringing down electric and telephone lines and uprooting trees. The system also washed away a railway bridge on Vanua Levu that was used to take sugar cane to Labasa's mills, growers had no choice but to go through the village of Korowiri. However, the workers refused to go into their fields unless they had police protection to go through the village, after Methodists from the local church attacked a group of growers for working on Sundays in defiance of Fiji's Sunday Observance Decree. Within Tonga only minor damage to weak structures, trees, banana plantations, electric and telephone lines was recorded. Within both Niue and the Southern Cook Islands only minor damage to crops and structures was reported.

Tropical Cyclone Lisa 

Tropical Cyclone Lisa moved into the South Pacific from the Australian region during May 11, while it was a Category 2 tropical cyclone with sustained wind speeds of 110 km/h (75 mph). Over the next couple of days, Lisa moved south-eastwards and passed in between the Vanuatuan islands of Tanna and Anatom as it gradually weakened and lost its tropical cyclone characteristics. Lisa's remnants subsequently started to deepen during May 14, under the influence of an upper level mid latitude trough and reached a secondary peak intensity of 100 km/h (65 mph). There were no reports of any significant damage associated with Lisa in Papua New Guinea, Vanuatu or the Solomon Islands.

Other systems 
Over the next two days the system moved westwards before it moved into the Australian basin during December 17, where it was later named Joy. A weak gale force tropical cyclone affected Tonga between December 14–17.

Over the next couple of days the system moved towards the south-east before the JTWC designated the system 16P and initiated advisories on it during March 18 after it had moved into the South Pacific basin. Over the next couple of days the system moved towards the south-southeast before it turned towards the southwest and passed over New Caledonia on March 20, before it was last noted during the next day as it moved back into the Australian region.

Season effects 
This table lists all the storms that developed in the South Pacific to the east of longitude 160°E during the 1990–91 season. It includes their intensity on the Australian tropical cyclone intensity scale, duration, name, landfalls, deaths, and damages. All data is taken from the warning centers from the region unless otherwise noted.

See also 

 List of off-season South Pacific tropical cyclones
Tropical cyclones in 1990 and 1991
 Atlantic hurricane seasons: 1990, 1991
 Pacific hurricane seasons: 1990, 1991
 Pacific typhoon seasons: 1990, 1991
 North Indian Ocean cyclone seasons: 1990, 1991

Notes

References

External links 

 
South Pacific cyclone seasons
Articles which contain graphical timelines